Summit Motorsports Park, formerly Norwalk Raceway Park and Norwalk Dragway, is a drag racing facility located at 1300 State Route 18 near Norwalk, Ohio.  It has been a National Hot Rod Association (NHRA) sanctioned facility since 2007 and annually hosts the Summit Racing Equipment NHRA Nationals an NHRA Camping World Drag Racing Series Event and the Cavalcade of Stars, an NHRA Lucas Oil Drag Racing Series Regional Event.  As well as the national events, the facility holds regular local competition throughout the season.

Norwalk Dragway opened to the public in 1963 but lay dormant for much of the first ten years of its existence.  Goodyear briefly used the track for tire testing up to 1973 when the track was sold to a joint venture between Wayne Sergeant and Bill Bader.  Sergeant pulled out of the deal the following year and Bader continued as the sole owner. The track was reopened on April 28, 1974.

In 1981, Norwalk hosted the International Hot Rod Association (IHRA) World Nationals for the first time.  It continued to host this event up to the 2006 season and had become the IHRA's flagship drag racing facility by this time.

In 2007, Ohio-based automotive parts company Summit Racing Equipment purchased the naming rights to the facility. The Pontiac Performance NHRA Nationals, held at National Trail Raceway in Hebron, Ohio between 1972 and 2006, found its new home at Summit Motorsports Park in 2007. In preparation for the facility's NHRA debut, millions of dollars were spent in upgrades and renovations.

In 2008, the last NHRA national event to run the nitromethane classes to 1320' was held here. Since this race, nitromethane classes have only been contested to 1000' to allow for more braking distance at national events.

In 2020, track owner Bill Bader temporarily shut down the track as a result of the COVID-19 pandemic, with plans to reopen in 2021.

References

External links
Summit Motorsports Park official website

NHRA Division 3 drag racing venues
Motorsport venues in Ohio
Buildings and structures in Huron County, Ohio
Tourist attractions in Huron County, Ohio
1963 establishments in Ohio
Sports venues completed in 1963